Robert Bauer (born 1952) is an American attorney who served as White House Counsel in the administration of President Barack Obama.

Robert Bauer may also refer to:
 Bob Bauer (baseball) (born 1930), American minor league baseball player and manager
 Bobby Bauer (1915–1964), Canadian hockey player
 Robert Albert Bauer (1910–2003), US Foreign Service Officer, anti-Nazi radio broadcaster, VOA announcer and author
 Robert Bauer (mycologist) (1950–2014), German mycologist
 Robert Bauer (soldier) (1907–1996), German World War II soldier
 Robert Bauer (footballer) (born 1995), German footballer player
 Robert Bauer (linguist) (born 1946), American honorary linguistics professor at the University of Hong Kong.
 Robert Bauer (actor), American actor and producer
 Robert Bauer (artist) (born 1942), American artist

See also
Rob Bauer, admiral in the Royal Netherlands Navy
Bauer (surname)